Richard D. Schnittker (May 27, 1928 – January 12, 2020) was an American professional basketball player born in Kelleys Island, Ohio.

A 6'5" forward from the Ohio State University, Schnittker played six seasons (1950–1951; 1953–1958) in the  National Basketball Association as a member of the Washington Capitols and Minneapolis Lakers.  He averaged 8.3 points per game and won championships with the Lakers in 1953 and 1954. Schnittker's debut for the Lakers in the 1952–53 season occurred during the playoffs. He was the first player to see action in the Finals after not playing a game during the preceding regular season, a feat later equalled by Tom Hoover in 1966 and Tracy McGrady in 2013.

In college Schnittker also played end on the Ohio State football team during the 1949 season.  After starting end Sonny Gandee went down with a season-ending neck injury, coach Wes Fesler recruited Schnittker to take Gandee's place.  Schnittker helped the team to a Big Ten championship and Rose Bowl appearance. He died on January 12, 2020, at the age of 91.

NBA career statistics

Regular season

Playoffs

References

External links

1928 births
2020 deaths
All-American college men's basketball players
American men's basketball players
Basketball players from Ohio
Minneapolis Lakers players
Ohio State Buckeyes men's basketball players
Ohio State Buckeyes football players
Power forwards (basketball)
Sportspeople from Sandusky, Ohio
Washington Capitols draft picks
Washington Capitols players